The Ingleton Group is a group of Ordovician turbiditic sandstones, siltstones, conglomerates found within  inliers in the Craven district of North Yorkshire, England. The two inliers are exposed in the valley of the River Doe northeast of Ingleton and at Horton-in-Ribblesdale to the east.  Of deep marine origin, these grey-green rocks are unconformably overlain by late Ordovician and Silurian strata. The sandstones are commercially exploited at Ingleton Quarry.

References

Geological groups of the United Kingdom
Geologic formations of England
Ordovician System of Europe
Ordovician England
Geology of Yorkshire
Geology of the Pennines